Jim Sinclair may refer to:

 Jim Sinclair (activist), American autism rights activist
 Jim Sinclair, character in Africa Texas Style
 Jim Sinclair (politician) (1933–2012), Canadian Non-Status Indian and Métis politician
 Jim Sinclair (footballer) (1907–2005), Australian rules footballer
 Jimmy Sinclair (footballer) (born 1957), Scottish footballer and coach

See also
James Sinclair (disambiguation)